René-Paul Victoria (born August 27, 1954 in Sainte-Suzanne, Réunion) was a member of the National Assembly of France, representing the island of Réunion.

He was a candidate for the National Assembly in 1997, and lost
against Michel Tamaya.

He was elected mayor of Saint-Denis, Réunion in 2001 against the socialist Michel Tamaya.
In 2009, he lost the elections against Gilbert Annette of the socialist party.

He was elected to the National Assembly of France, defeating the deputy of Saint-Denis, Réunion, Michel Tamaya in 2002 and was reelected in 2008 against Gilbert Annette with 51,46% of votes.

In 2008 he left UMP - Union for a Popular Movement together with other Reunion Politicians and founded "Objective Réunion".

In 2014 he was condemned to 3 years of ineligibility.

In 2015 he was excluded from the party Les Republicans.

References
http://www.assemblee-nationale.fr/elections/2007/resultats/LDD_DEP.csv.asp
http://www.assemblee-nationale.fr/elections/circ97-2/974.asp
http://www.leparisien.fr/resultats/elections-municipales-2008-saint-denis-97400.php

1954 births
Living people
The Republicans (France) politicians
Mayors of places in Réunion
Deputies of the 12th National Assembly of the French Fifth Republic
Deputies of the 13th National Assembly of the French Fifth Republic

Black French politicians
Members of Parliament for Réunion